The 13th annual Miss Earth México pageant was held at Salón 53 in Culiacán, Sinaloa on September 20, 2014. Thirty-two contestants of the Mexican Republic competed for the national title, which was won by Yareli Carrillo from Sinaloa who later competed in Miss Earth 2014 in Philippines where she was a Semifinalist in the Top 16. Carrillo was crowned by outgoing Miss Earth México titleholder Cristal Silva. She is the first Sinaloense to win this title.

Results

Miss Earth México

Order of Announcements

Top 16

Top 8

Top 4

Special Awards

Judges

Preliminary Competition

Final Competition

Background Music

Expected Contestants

Contestants Notes

Crossovers

Contestants who previously competed or will compete at other beauty pageants:

Miss Earth
 2014: : Yareli Carrillo (Top 16)

Miss Heritage
 2014: : Andrea Zenteno (Top 8)

Miss Exclusive of the World
 2015: : Alma Guzmán (Top 20)

The Miss Globe
 2015: : Andrea Zenteno (Top 15)

Miss West Indies 
 2014: : Marcella Rizo (2nd Runner-up)

Miss Bikini Universe
 2015: : Alma Guzmán (Top 12)

Miss Embajadora Mundial del Turismo
 2015: : Liliana Rodríguez (2nd Runner-up)

N1 Model of the World
 2014: : María José Torrado

Nuestra Belleza Aguascalientes
 2014: : María José Torrado

Nuestra Belleza Baja California
 2014: : Adriana Assad

Nuestra Belleza Coahuila
 2014: : Liliana Rodríguez

Nuestra Belleza Jalisco
 2012: : Haydee Vizcaíno

Nuestra Belleza Nuevo León
 2013: : Sugheidy Willie (3rd Runner-up)
 2016 : Rebeca Pérez (Winner)

Nuestra Belleza Puebla
 2012: : Mervi Pelzer

Nuestra Belleza Sonora
 2014: : Karla Serrano

Nuestra Belleza Tamaulipas
 2013: : Rebeca Pérez

Nuestra Belleza Veracruz
 2014: : Lidia Arano (3rd Runner-up)

Nuestra Belleza Zacatecas
 2013: : Bertha García

Nuestra Belleza Sur de Tamaulipas
 2013: : Rebeca Pérez (Winner)

Nuestra Belleza Tres Valles
 2014: : Lidia Arano (Winner)

Reina de la Feria de San Marcos
 2014: : María José Torrado

Chica E! México
 2015: : Cristina Cortés

References

External links
Official Website

2014
2014 in Mexico
2014 beauty pageants